Vincent Fantauzzo (born 1977, Manchester, England), is a Melbourne-based Australian portrait artist known for his award winning portraits of Heath Ledger, Brandon Walters, Matt Moran, Emma Hack, Baz Luhrmann, Asher Keddie and his son Luca. He has won the Doug Moran National Portrait Prize twice, the Archibald Packing Room Prize, and the Archibald People's Choice Award four times.

Career 
Fantauzzo was born in England in 1977 and spent his very early years in Manchester. His family migrated to Australia when he was a child. He has a Bachelor of Fine Art (Painting) (2003) and a Master of Fine Art (2005) from RMIT University, Melbourne. He has had solo exhibitions at Dianne Tanzer Gallery in Melbourne in 2007 and 2008 and in Mumbai India in 2007. He won the 2003 Tolarno RMIT Partnership Prize and was a finalist in the 2007 Shirley Hannan Portrait Prize, DLAP, Whyalla Art Award and Duke Gold Coast Art Prize.

In 2008 he was awarded an artist's residency at Chancery Lane Gallery in Hong Kong where he had a solo exhibition. He has also had solo exhibitions at the L. A. Art Fair and at Sydney's Boutwell Draper Gallery, which coincided with the opening of the Archibald. He was a finalist in 2008's Metro 5 Art Award, EMSC Award and Duke Gold Coast Art Prize.

Fantauzzo is known for his photorealistic style, which, according to the art critic for The Australian, Christopher Allen, is to painting what lip-syncing is to singing. Allen described the portrait of Keddie in 2013 as "an elaborate oil rendition of a photograph that trivialises the art of painting and that of photography, as well as apparently contravening the rules of the exhibition."

Fantauzzo was chosen to paint the official portrait of former Labor Prime Minister Julia Gillard in 2017. The portrait was unveiled in Parliament House Canberra on 24 October 2018.

Selected works
2008 Heath – (Heath Ledger) Archibald People's Choice
2009 Brandon – (Brandon Walters) Archibald People's Choice
2011 Matt Moran – Archibald Packing Room Prize
2011 Baz Luhrmann "Off Screen" – Doug Moran National Portrait Prize
2013 Love Face – (Asher Keddie) Archibald People's Choice
2014 All that's good in me – (self-portrait as son Luca) Archibald People's Choice
2021 Muse – (Asher Keddie) Doug Moran National Portrait Prize (joint winner)

Family
Fantauzzo has a son, Luca, born 2010, by his first wife, Michelle.

He has a second son, Valentino, with his second wife, Asher Keddie. Fantauzzo met Keddie in 2012 after both had separated from their spouses. Fantauzzo's 2012 portrait of Keddie won the People's Choice Award at the 2013 Archibald Prize. They married in April 2014.  On 1 March 2015, the couple welcomed their first child.

References
Notes

Sources

External links

1977 births
Living people
People from Melbourne
RMIT University alumni
Australian portrait painters
Photorealist artists
Archibald Prize finalists
Archibald Prize Packing Room Prize winners
Archibald Prize People's Choice Award winners
Doug Moran National Portrait Prize winners